Frank Jesús Mata (born March 11, 1984) is a former Venezuelan professional baseball pitcher. He played for the Baltimore Orioles.

Career

Minnesota Twins
Mata was in the Minnesota Twins minor league system from 2004-2009 and he became a free agent after the 2009 season.

Baltimore Orioles
Mata signed a minor league deal with the Orioles Baltimore Orioles in 2010. He was called after closing for the Norfolk Tides to replace Alfredo Simón. He made his debut on May 26 against the Oakland Athletics and went 1.1 innings with one hit and one walk in relief of Brian Matusz. His worst outing came on June 14, 2010, at the Giants, when he gave up 4 runs in 1.2 inning. He came in the 7th for Matt Albers, finished the 7th clean, but in the 8th, he gave up a double to Juan Uribe, gave up 2 bases-loaded walks to Travis Ishikawa and Andrés Torres, then a 2 RBI single to Freddy Sanchez.

Florida Marlins
After signing with the Florida Marlins after 2010, he was released in late July 2011.

Piratas de Campeches
On March 26, 2012, Mata signed with the Piratas de Campeche of the Mexican Baseball League. He was released on June 12, 2012.

Olmecas de Tabasco
On June 26, 2012, Mata signed with the Olmecas de Tabasco of the Mexican Baseball League. He was released on June 29, 2012.

Templiers de Sénart
In 2018, Mata played with Templiers de Sénart in the French Division 1 Baseball Championship.

See also
 List of Major League Baseball players from Venezuela

References

External links

1984 births
Living people
Baltimore Orioles players
Beloit Snappers players
Bravos de Margarita players
Cardenales de Lara players
Elizabethton Twins players
Fort Myers Miracle players
Major League Baseball pitchers
Major League Baseball players from Venezuela
Mexican League baseball pitchers
New Britain Rock Cats players
New Orleans Zephyrs players
Norfolk Tides players
Olmecas de Tabasco players
People from Barcelona, Venezuela
Piratas de Campeche players
Tigres de Aragua players
Venezuelan expatriate baseball players in Mexico
Venezuelan expatriate baseball players in the United States
Venezuelan expatriate sportspeople in France